Didzis is a Latvian masculine given name of Old High German origin. It is occasionally a diminutive of the names Dītrihs and Didrikis. It is a cognate to the German name Dietrich. The first recorded usage of the name in the areas of modern-day Latvia date from the early 19th-century.

Individuals bearing the name Didzis include:
Didzis Gavars (born 1966), Latvian politician
Didzis Matīss (born 1980), Latvian football manager
Didzis Skuška (born 1968), Latvian bobsledder

References

Latvian masculine given names